Songs from the Stars is a novel by Norman Spinrad published in 1980.

Plot summary
Songs from the Stars is a novel in which Clear Blue Lou and Sunshine Sue help manage the society of Aquaria, the only human civilization that survived a nuclear war.

Reception
Kirkus Reviews states "Debates on communications and karma ensue. Gassy."

Tom Easton reviewed Songs from the Stars for Analog Science Fiction/Science Fact, and commented that "I enjoyed Songs, and I believe it should be read widely. Spinrad has split human life into technophilia and technophia, and effectively dramatized the necessity of reconciling the two if anyone is to have a life of freedom and comfort."

Greg Costikyan reviewed Songs from the Stars in Ares Magazine #8 and commented that "Whatever dialectical disagreements one may have with Spinrad's themes, Songs from the Stars shows once again that he is an extremely powerful writer – among the best science fiction has to offer."

Reviews
Review by Algis Budrys (1981) in The Magazine of Fantasy & Science Fiction, January 1981 
Review by Tom Staicar (1981) in Amazing Stories, January 1981 
Review by Theodore Sturgeon (1981) in Rod Serling's The Twilight Zone Magazine, June 1981 
Review by Paul Kincaid (1981) in Vector 103

References

1980 American novels
American science fiction novels
Simon & Schuster books